William Palmer (fl. early 1400s) was the member of Parliament for Malmesbury for multiple parliaments from 1417 to 1437. He was described in The History of Parliament (1993) as "virtually monopolized one of the Malmesbury seats during that period."

References 

Members of the Parliament of England for Malmesbury
English MPs 1417
Year of birth unknown
Year of death unknown
English MPs 1419
English MPs 1420
English MPs May 1421
English MPs December 1421
English MPs 1427
English MPs 1429
English MPs 1432
English MPs 1433
English MPs 1435
English MPs 1437